Mel Tormé Live at the Playboy Jazz Festival is a 2002 live album by Mel Tormé, recorded at the Hollywood Bowl at the 1993 Playboy Jazz Festival.

Track listing 
 "Opus No. 1" (Benny Goodman, Lionel Hampton, Sy Oliver) – 2:17
 "I Had the Craziest Dream"/"Darn That Dream" (Mack Gordon, Harry Warren)/(Van Heusen, Eddie DeLange) – 4:52
 "I'm Gonna Go Fishin'" (Duke Ellington, Peggy Lee) – 3:06
 Medley: "Sophisticated Lady"/"I Didn't Know About You" (Ellington, Irving Mills, Mitchell Parish)/(Ellington, Bob Russell) – 5:25
 "It Don't Mean a Thing (If It Ain't Got That Swing)" (Ellington, Mills) – 5:29
 Medley: "Stompin' at the Savoy"/"Don't Be That Way"/"And the Angels Sing" (Andy Razaf, Edgar Sampson)/(Goodman, Sampson, Parish)/(Ziggy Elman, Johnny Mercer) – 14:38

Personnel 
Performance
 Mel Tormé - vocals
Ray Anthony Orchestra
 Ray Anthony - trumpet
 Kevin Anthony - saxophone
 Lee Callet
 Bob Efford
 Salvadore Lozano
 Roger Neumann
 Andy Martin - trombone
 Morris Repass
 Bill Tole
 Lloyd Ulyate
 Wayne Bergeron - trumpet
 Ramon Flores
 George Graham
 Frank Szabo
 John Colianni - piano
 Tom Ranier
 John Leitham - double bass
 Kirk Smith
 Frank Capp - drums
 Donny Osbourne
Production
 Glen Barros - executive producer
 John Burk - producer, executive producer
 George Wein - producer
 Valerie Whitesell - production coordination
 Hugh Hefner - liner notes, executive producer
 A. James Liska - liner notes
 Seth Presant - mastering, assembly

References 

Mel Tormé live albums
2002 live albums
Albums recorded at the Hollywood Bowl